The KONG Company (stylized as KONG) is an American company headquartered in the state of Colorado that develops designs and produces lines of dog toys and cat toys. Its primary line of product is a snowman-like chew toy for dogs also named KONG.

History
The company founder, Joe Markham, created the KONG product in the 1970s, when he noticed his German shepherd Fritz damaging his teeth by chewing rocks. He found that Fritz enjoyed chewing on a hard rubber Volkswagen Bus suspension device, and spent about six years experimenting with different compounds to produce a chew toy of similar size and shape that he could sell to pet owners.  A friend commented that the toy looked like "an earplug for King Kong"—hence its name. Originally, Markham sold most of his products to Israel, Japan, Australia and the United Kingdom, but the KONG began a rise in sales in the United States in the mid-1980s, and has remained popular there subsequently. The book Planet Dog: A Doglopedia (2005) describes the KONG as "possibly the best-known dog toy in the world".

Products
The classic KONG toy resembles a snowman-like structure of three balls pushed together. They also come in several variations for dogs of different ages and sizes. Made of rubber, they are hollow in the middle, and can be stuffed with treats or frozen to provide longer distraction for dogs. The classic KONG product is also offered in different rubber types, tailored to dogs of different chewing capabilities, ages, and sizes.

In addition to the typical snowman-like KONGs, KONG also offers a line of dental chews, balls, pull toys (such as the KONG Wubba and the KONG Tugger Knots), Frisbees, a dog binky, floating toys, squeakers, and various interactive toys and accessories. For cats, KONG also has a line of toys including a cat version of their "Wubba", as well as scratching boards, catnip, and other chew toys.

References

Dog equipment
Cat equipment
Companies based in Golden, Colorado
1976 establishments in Colorado